Daniel Joseph Kinahan (born 25 June 1977) is an Irish boxing promoter and suspected crime boss. He has been named by the High Court of Ireland as a senior figure in organised crime on a global scale. The Criminal Assets Bureau has stated he "controlled and managed" the operations of the Kinahan Organised Crime Group (commonly called the Kinahan Cartel), a criminal organisation which smuggles drugs and firearms into Ireland, the UK, and mainland Europe, and "has associations that facilitate international criminal activity in Europe, Asia, the Middle East, and South America".

The Kinahan Cartel has had an ongoing feud with the Hutch Gang. The feud began in 2015, when Gary Hutch was murdered in Marbella, Spain by the Kinahan gang. As of August 2021, at least 18 people have been killed in the feud.

In October 2022 the head of the Irish police Drugs and Organised Crime Bureau stated in an affidavit to the Irish High Court that Kinahan had "sanctioned a number of murders" as part of the Hutch–Kinahan feud, during a CAB court case where properties were ordered seized by the judge as it was proven they were the proceeds of crime.

Early life
Kinahan was born in Dublin on 25 June 1977, the eldest son of Jean Boylan (died 2014) and Christy Kinahan. His father is a high powered convicted drug dealer who was widely reported to be the founder and leader of the Kinahan Cartel. Kinahan grew up in Tallaght and then returned to Dublin, where he lived in Oliver Bond flats in the Liberties area. At the age of 23, he was one of five people arrested in connection with a "vicious attack" on two members of the Irish police outside Shelbourne Park; he was charged with assault and refused bail by Dublin District Court. The charges were dropped the next year.

Kinahan Cartel

Overview
In a 2009 diplomatic cable sent from a U.S. embassy in South America to The Pentagon, Kinahan was described as a "suspected international drug-trafficking figure".

Kinahan was arrested in Spain in 2010 during a joint operation between Spanish, Irish, and British authorities, in which the British Serious Organised Crime Agency (the predecessor to the National Crime Agency) deployed more than 200 officers in the arrest phase of the multinational drug trafficking inquiry.

Kinahan was the reported target of the 2016 Regency Hotel Shooting in Dublin, in which three people were shot, including 32-year-old Kinahan associate David Byrne, who was shot dead. It was reported that the Garda Síochána believed Kinahan fled the attack by jumping out of a window. He has also been the target of at least one more assassination attempt.

In 2018, a Spanish police officer told a court in Marbella that Kinahan had ordered the murder of gang rival Gary Hutch on the Costa del Sol in 2015.

Ban on entering the United States
He is banned from entering the US, having been placed on a list of "narco terrorists", compiled by the FBI and Drug Enforcement Administration. There are 27 other associates of the Kinahan Cartel who are also banned from entering the US. His father, Christy Kinahan, and brother Christopher Jr, are also banned from entering the US. Kinahan is reported to be a target for the UK's National Crime Agency.

Drug Enforcement Agency documents
DEA documents sent to the Dutch police exposed what would be a super drug cartel headed by Daniel Kinahan, Raffaele Imperiale (Camorra's drugs and arms dealer), Ridouan Taghi (Dutch criminal, now in jail) and Edin Gačanin (Bosnian drug trafficker). The group was observed by the DEA having meetings in the Burj Al Arab hotel in Dubai, the base of the alleged cartel. The meetings took place in 2017, however, it only reached the Dutch media in October 2019. The DEA regards this as one of the world's fifty largest drug cartels, with a virtual monopoly of Peruvian cocaine and it would control around a third of the cocaine trade in Europe. According to the DEA documents, the destination for all the drugs shipments would be Dutch ports.

Criminal Assets Bureau case
In March 2022, it was revealed that the Criminal Assets Bureau was pursuing a case against Kinahan, Jim Mansfield Jnr and fellow cartel member Thomas "Bomber" Kavanagh. The case had been pursued for over a year in secret, with Mansfield as the main target, with Kinahan and Kavanagh, among others as respondents.

A three-hour podcast interview by James English was to be released on 17 March 2022, but English announced on 14 March that the podcast was cancelled due to legal issues.

United States sanctions
In April 2022 the Office of Foreign Assets Control (OFAC) of the United States Department of the Treasury imposed sanctions on Daniel Kinahan, his father Christy Kinahan and brother Christy Kinahan Jr. as well as four other key associates of the Kinahan family. The OFAC notice refers to the family and its associates collectively as the "Kinahan Organized Crime Group" or "KOCG."

The addition to SDN List blocks any property of the designated persons within the United States financial system, and prohibits United States persons from business dealings with them. Violations of the sanctions, including assisting in their evasion, come with a maximum criminal penalty of twenty years imprisonment.

On 12 April 2022, the United States Department of State announced the offering of rewards of up to US$5 million under the Narcotics Rewards Program for information leading to the arrest and/or conviction of the Kinahan family members. The reward is offered jointly with the Garda Síochána, National Crime Agency, and Drug Enforcement Administration.

On the morning of Monday 13 September 2022, a combined force of six enforcement agencies led by the Spanish Civil Guard's elite Central Operative Unit, arrested English-born former Cork restuaranter John Francis "Johnny" Morrissey at his villa in Marbella, Spain. Known to be a former enforcer and current money-launderer for the KOCG, he was the first of the seven named by the OFAC to be arrested, having fled Ireland more than 20 years before after reportedly being involved in a bid to harm a Criminal Assets Bureau officer in Ireland. Morrissey gained noteoriety from being part of the team publicising his wife Nicola's Scottish-based Nero Drinks Company Ltd, which was thought to be part of Morrissey's €200 million EUR annual money-laundering operation, leading to her arrest as well at the same time.

Bank accounts freeze
On 21 April 2022, the United Arab Emirates froze his assets, including both personal and business bank accounts.

Boxing promotion

Overview
In 2012, Kinahan founded MTK Global (originally named MGM) with Irish boxer Matthew Macklin in Marbella, Spain. Since its founding, MTK Global has signed a host of world-class fighters, such as Tyson Fury and Darren Till. In 2017, in the wake of the shooting of David Byrne of which Kinahan was considered the main target, MTK Global claimed to have cut its ties with Kinahan. However, he has remained a prominent figure in the international boxing world, including as an advisor and matchmaker for Fury.

Despite the apparent cutting of ties with MTK Global in February 2017, Kinahan remained an active figure in global boxing. On 10 June 2020, it was reported that Tyson Fury and Anthony Joshua had reached an agreement in principle for a two-fight deal, which pundits touted as the "biggest fight in British boxing history". Fury publicly thanked Kinahan for helping to broker the agreement. "Big shout-out Dan, he got this done, literally over the line, two-fight deal, Tyson Fury versus Anthony Joshua next year." he said. In March 2022, Mauricio Sulaimán, President World Boxing Council (WBC) said of Kinahan: “I am nobody to judge any person, and that has been the policy of our organisation, to combat all types of discrimination and abuse of power, before any person and group. That is why Daniel will have our full support in his quest to bring benefits to boxing.”

In June 2020, the Irish government expressed its "outrage" over the involvement of Kinahan in the brokering of the proposed boxing agreement, leading to Kinahan being named in the Irish parliament, Dáil Éireann, and being singled out by Taoiseach Leo Varadkar, the country's prime minister. The Irish Department of Foreign Affairs contacted authorities in the United Arab Emirates regarding Kinahan. BBC News reported that "politicians, police officers and the public in Ireland are keen that the outside world get to know what they call the real Daniel Kinahan."

Also in June 2020, Kinahan, who served as a "special adviser" to KHK Sports was dropped from the role after just a month. KHK Sports, owned by Khalid bin Hamad Al Khalifa, a son of the king of Bahrain, enlisted the assistance of the head of international media relations for the Bahrain government, in communicating the statement of Kinahan's termination in the role to media outlets directly.

Panorama documentary
In February 2021 BBC Panorama broadcast a report on Kinahan's involvement in boxing. Barry McGuigan spoke of intimidation in boxing. Daniel Kinahan denied the allegations.

Robert Smith, of the British Boxing Board of Control, said that there was nothing that the Board could do about Kinahan. On the Panorama programme, lawyers acting for MTK Global confirmed that Kinahan was still advising fighters. Smith said "It was disappointing for the sport, obviously, but the gentleman is not licensed by the British Boxing Board in any capacity. We don’t license MTK as a promoter. We license individuals so the named promoter is Lee Eaton and he is the only person we deal with." (Lee Eaton is an employee of MTK Global.) Smith said that a loophole in the regulations of the Board meant that they were powerless to regulate "advisers" such as Kinahan.

On 5 February the Police Service of Northern Ireland (PSNI) announced that the Panorama team who produced the documentary had been threatened. One journalist was forced to move out of his home in Northern Ireland and his family were moved to a secure location under PSNI protection due to a threat to his life.

On 7 February 2021 Billy Joe Saunders, a boxer who employs Kinahan as adviser, sent journalist Nicola Tallant direct messages on Twitter challenging her "write something positive about Daniel Kinahan" in exchange for being granted a face-to-face interview with Kinahan. Tallant, who writes for the Sunday World, rejected the offer.

On 8 February 2021, Kinahan issued a statement to Talksport in the UK denying that he was part of any criminal organisation. He also denied making threats to a journalist and confirmed that he was still involved in boxing. He claimed the Panorama programme "was a rehash of unsubstantiated allegations that have been made previously on many occasions". He criticised the Special Criminal Court (despite being named as very senior figure in organised crime on a global scale by the High Court – not the SCC) and said he had no convictions. Kinahan has never contested findings of fact made against him in Irish courts.

Summons issued
In December 2020 a racketeering summons was served to him in Qatar by US lawyers. Boxing promoter Moses Herrida filed a civil cause of action over the signing of Joseph Diaz while he was under contract to Herrida Boxing Management. He alleged that after Diaz won the world championship in 2020 MTK had offered him an advance of $100,000 (₡81,500) in breach of a five-year contract the boxer had signed with HBM. Herrida also claims that Daniel Kinahan and MTK are in breach of the RICO Act, which can be used in civil cases. Herrida alleges that Kinahan founded MTK Global as a "front business" to launder illicit proceeds from drug trafficking and that despite claims that Kinahan is no longer involved with the organisation he is still "influencing and controlling" it. Kinahan has to file a response with the United States District Court for the Central District of California or face judgement being entered against him by default.

Personal life
As of 2019, Kinahan and his brother Christopher Jr. live in Dubai. According to the Office of Foreign Assets Control, he has a residence in the Palm Jumeirah. He was married in May 2017 at the Burj Al Arab. Guests included criminals from various backgrounds such as Ridouan Taghi and Naoufal Fassih (both Moroccan-Dutch), Ricardo Riquelme Vega (Chilean), and Raffaele Imperiale (Italian). Dutch police are investigating claims by a man known as Nabil B that they were working together after the wedding party helped investigators identify a "super cartel" alliance. Messages recovered from Ennetcom servers have also supported claims that the criminals in question are doing business together.

Kinahan is married to Caoimhe Robinson since 2017. Robinson is from the Coolock area of Dublin.

References

Irish gangsters
Living people
Boxing promoters
Year of birth uncertain
Kinahan Organised Crime Group
Specially Designated Nationals and Blocked Persons List
Criminals from Dublin (city)
1977 births